The U.S. 40 and 59 Bridges are twin multi-beam girder bridges over the Kansas River at Lawrence, Kansas.
The west bridge carries two lanes of southbound traffic, connecting to Vermont Street, while the east bridge carries two lanes of northbound traffic from Massachusetts Street. Both bridges converge on the north end to become North 2nd Street. The east bridge is also the third bridge to be built at this location.

Original bridge 
The first bridge was a 690-foot five-span Howe truss bridge built in 1864 by the Lawrence Bridge Company at a cost of $47,000. It was the first bridge across the Kansas River west of Kansas City. It was operated as a toll bridge until 1879, when the Kansas Supreme Court revoked the company's charter and seized the bridge on behalf of the state.

The first bridge was washed out by floods in 1876 and 1903 and rebuilt. By 1913, the bridge was determined to be unsafe, and was subsequently replaced with the second bridge.

Second bridge 
The second bridge, a 1,026 foot concrete arch bridge, was built by Douglas County and opened in January 1917. The bridge deck originally had a brick surface with a set of streetcar tracks down the center. The brick deck was later paved over.

By 1972, the bridge had begun to deteriorate due to years of road salt, and required patching of the south span across the Santa Fe Railway track. In addition, a water main had been placed on the west side of the bridge at rail height. The bridge was carrying 17,000 vehicles per day.

By 1973, Lawrence and Douglas County had agreed to hold a bond election for replacement of the Kansas River bridge. Initially proposed as a single four lane bridge at a cost of $3 million, plans were changed to a pair of two lane bridges, with the estimated costs increased to $5 million. Voters approved the bond issue to replace the Kansas River bridge in November 1974.

By January 1975, the spandrel beams on the deck had deteriorated to the point where an engineering consultant suggested that they may fail and cause a section of the bridge deck to drop. The consultant recommended that an eight-ton weight limit be imposed on the bridge, which was approved by the Lawrence City Commission over the opposition of truckers.

Current bridges 
Work began on the new Vermont Street bridge in April 1976. The winning contractor had bid $4.5 million, a figure that was considered "surprisingly low." Due to delays, the Vermont Street bridge was not completed and opened to traffic until April 4, 1978, at which time the old Massachusetts Street bridge was closed, and two-way traffic was temporally carried on the new bridge.

The old bridge was demolished manually, with some of the bridge material used as temporary fill as part of construction of the new bridge. Additional delays occurred on the new Massachusetts Street bridge; it was completed by January 1980, roughly a year and a half behind schedule. The bridge was not opened until March to allow the deck additional time to cure and not be exposed to winter salt treatments that could deteriorate the deck.

Image gallery

References 

Bridges completed in 1978
Bridges completed in 1980
Bridges of the United States Numbered Highway System
Bridges over the Kansas River
Former toll bridges in Kansas
Road bridges in Kansas
U.S. Route 40
U.S. Route 59
Concrete bridges in the United States
Girder bridges in the United States
Buildings and structures in Douglas County, Kansas